Vasilios Georgopoulos (born 15 March 1956) is a Greek retired football midfielder and later manager.

References

1956 births
Living people
Greek footballers
Kalamata F.C. players
Panachaiki F.C. players
PAOK FC players
Panionios F.C. players
AEK Athens F.C. players
Super League Greece players
Greek football managers
Kalamata F.C. managers
Olympiacos F.C. non-playing staff
Association football midfielders
Greece international footballers
Footballers from Kalamata